Oegoconia annae is a moth of the family Autostichidae. It is found on Sardinia.

The length of the forewings is 11–14 mm. The forewings are blackish brown with white markings. The hindwings are bright grey-brown.

Etymology
The species is named for the wife of the author.

References

Moths described in 2007
Oegoconia
Moths of Europe